Folke Karl Skoog (July 15, 1908 – February 15, 2001) was a Swedish-born American plant physiologist who was a pioneer in the field of plant growth regulators, particularly cytokinins. Skoog was a recipient of the National Medal of Science 1991.

Born in Halland, Sweden, Skoog emigrated to the United States during a trip to California in 1925, and was naturalized as a citizen almost a decade later. He competed, and finished sixth in heat 2, in the 1500 meter race during the 1932 Summer Olympics. In 1936, he received his PhD in biology from Caltech for his work done with auxin, a plant hormone.

In 1937, Skoog was a postdoctoral researcher with Dennis Robert Hoagland, and his professional career advanced significantly with his arrival at the University of Wisconsin–Madison in 1947. Carlos O. Miller discovered kinetin in 1954, and benzyladenine and related compounds were later synthesized in Skoog's lab.

In 1962, Skoog and Toshio Murashige published what is probably the best-known paper in plant tissue culture; in a fruitless attempt to discover a yet-unknown plant growth regulator in tobacco juice for his doctoral thesis, Murashige and Skoog instead developed a greatly improved salt base for the sterile culture of tobacco. Now referred to as Murashige and Skoog medium, the final paper (Murashige, T. and Skoog, F. (1962) A revised medium for rapid growth and bioassays with tobacco tissue cultures. Physiol Plant 18: 100-127) is one of the most often-cited papers in biology. Now 60 years after the work, M&S salt base remains an essential component in plant tissue culture, but not in hydroponics.

In 1970, Skoog was elected a foreign member of the Royal Swedish Academy of Sciences.

References

1908 births
2001 deaths
Swedish scientists
California Institute of Technology alumni
University of Wisconsin–Madison faculty
National Medal of Science laureates
Athletes (track and field) at the 1932 Summer Olympics
Members of the Royal Swedish Academy of Sciences
Plant physiologists
Members of the United States National Academy of Sciences
Olympic athletes of Sweden
Swedish emigrants to the United States

Washington University in St. Louis faculty
Johns Hopkins University faculty
University of Hawaiʻi faculty
University of California, Berkeley faculty